Volokolamskaya is a railway station of Line D2 of the Moscow Central Diameters in Moscow. It was opened on 23 November 2019.

Gallery

References

Railway stations in Moscow
Railway stations of Moscow Railway
Railway stations in Russia opened in 2019
Line D2 (Moscow Central Diameters) stations